Draft boards are a part of the Selective Service System which register and select men of military age in the event of conscription in the United States.

Local board
The local draft board is a board that administers and executes the main provisions of the Selective Draft Law. Its functions comprise the registration, rejection and selection of men of military age as fixed by legislative enactment. It is also responsible to the government for the part of mobilization up to arrival in camp, of those who "passed" and are "called". A local draft board has jurisdiction over a prescribed territory determined by population. Larger cities had fifty or more local draft boards.

District board
A district appeal board is established in each Congressional district and hears appeals from the decisions of the local draft boards. A final appeal from the district boards' decisions could be made to the President of the United States.

References
This article incorporates text from the Teachers' monographs: Plans and details of grade work, a publication now in the public domain.

Conscription in the United States